Kazuo Shimizu (Shinjitai: 清水 和夫, born 11 February 1954, in Tokyo) is a Japanese racing driver. Shimizu was also active as a rally driver and later as a touring car racer. He won second place in the 1992 All Japan Touring Car Championship.  His teammate at this time was Tom Kristensen. Since 1994, he has participated in the JTCC from the privateer team. He participated in Japanese races, and in the 24 Hours of Le Mans and the 12 Hours of Sebring.  He is currently an international motoring journalist.

Complete JTC results

Complete 24 Hours of Le Mans results

Complete Spa 24 Hour results

References

1954 births
Living people
Japanese racing drivers
Japanese sports journalists
Japanese rally drivers
Japanese Touring Car Championship drivers
24 Hours of Le Mans drivers

Nürburgring 24 Hours drivers
24 Hours of Spa drivers